Chipewyan 201C is an Indian reserve of the Athabasca Chipewyan First Nation in Alberta, located within the Regional Municipality of Wood Buffalo. It is on the east side of Richardson Lake, about 7 miles south of Lake Athabasca.

References

Indian reserves in Alberta